The Gyeongui–Jungang Line is a commuter rail service of the Seoul Metropolitan Subway system, operating on trackage from the Gyeongui Line (opened on July 1, 2009) and the Jungang Line (opened on December 16, 2005).

Frequent service is provided between Munsan and Yongmun by 8-car trains, with 6 trains weekdays and 5 on weekends running one station east of Yongmun to Jipyeong. However, some services (run by 4-car trains) split for Seoul Station east of Gajwa. Additionally, many trains terminate at various locations on the line such as Ilsan, Neunggok, Daegok, Yongsan, Cheongnyangni, Deokso, and Paldang.

Trains travel along the Gyeongui (Munsan-Seoul Station/Gajwa), Yongsan (Gajwa-Yongsan), Gyeongwon (Yongsan-Hoegi), and Jungang (Hoegi-Jipyeong) lines.

The line runs on the left-hand side of the track, like all other Korail-run Seoul Metropolitan Subway lines. 

Travel time is approximately 3 hours all the way and many express services cut the time to 2h 15 min

The color shown on the map is jade.

History 

2005:
December 16: The Jungang Line section is officially opened from Yongsan to Deokso as the Yongsan-Deokso Line.

2007:
December 27: The Jungang Line section is extended eastward from Deokso to Paldang. The Yongsan-Deokso Line is renamed to the Jungang Line.

2008:
December 29: The Jungang Line section is extended eastward from Paldang to Guksu. 

2009:
July 1: The Gyeongui Line section is officially opened from Munsan to Digital Media City as the Gyeongui Line, with a spur line to Seoul Station.
December 23: The Jungang Line section is extended eastward from Guksu to Yongmun. Sinwon station is opened as an in-fill station on the Jungang Line section.

2010:
December 21: Sangbong station and Obin station open as in-fill stations on the Jungang Line section.

2012:
December 15: The Gyeongui Line section's main line is extended eastward from Digital Media City to Gongdeok.

2014:
October 25: Gangmae station opens as an in-fill station on the Gyeongui Line section.
December 27: The Gyeongui Line section is extended eastward from Gongdeok to Yongsan, and the present Gyeongui-Jungang Line is formed after Gyeongui and Jungang lines are merged.

2015:
October 31: Yadang station opens as an in-fill station.

2016:
April 30: Hyochang Park station opens as an in-fill station.

2017:
January 21: The line is extended eastward from Yongmun to Jipyeong.

2020:
March 28: A shuttle service began operating between Munsan and Imjingang.

2021:
January 5: Express service is modified, with all trains running express on the Gyeongui Line portion of the line now stopping at Yadang and Tanhyeon, and all main line trains running express on the Gyeongui Line portion stopping at Unjeong.
December 11: Another shuttle service began operating between Imjingang and Dorasan, finally replacing "Commuter Train" service along the whole Gyeongui Line.
2022:
December 17: Uncheon station opens as an in-fill station between Imjingang and Munsan after being relocated.

Future Plans
An in-fill station at Hyang-dong, between Hwajeon and Susaek, is expected to open in 2024.

Rapid (Express) trains 
Korail operates a variety of express "rapid" (급행) trains for regional services on the Gyeongui-Jungang Line. These services include:
Gyeongui Line express services via the Seoul Station branch, operating express between Munsan and Gajwa and then continuing as local trains to Seoul Station.
Gyeongui Line express services via the Yongsan Line, operating express between Munsan and Yongsan and then continuing as local trains on the Jungang Line (east of Yongsan).
Jungang Line express services, operating express between Yongmun and Yongsan and then continuing as local trains on the Gyeongui Line (west of Yongsan).

Stations 
GY: Gyeongui Line Express, via the Yongsan Line
GS: Gyeongui Line Express, to Seoul Station via Sinchon station
J: Jungang Line Express

Main Line

Shuttle Service beyond Munsan 
 I: Munsan-Imjingang Shuttle
 D: Imjingang-Dorasan Shuttle

Seoul Station~Gajwa

Rolling stock 

Korail Class 321000 (21 trains)
Korail Class 331000 (27 trains)

References 

 
Seoul Metropolitan Subway lines
Railway lines opened in 2014